Ash K. Prakash  D.F.A., is a philanthropist and scholar of Canadian art.

Career
After completing his studies at the University of California and the University of Michigan, and later Harvard, Ash Prakash emigrated to Canada in 1968, settling in Ottawa by 1970. Here he worked in the federal government of Canada for 25 years, becoming the Executive Director and Principal Advisor on Information Management to the Queen's Privy Council for Canada and the Office of the Prime Minister (Canada) as well as serving in the Office of the Leader of Government in the House of Commons and Royal Commissions of Inquiry. He also advised the Canada Council for the Arts, the Canadian Broadcasting Company in Ottawa; UNESCO in Paris, Teheran and New Delhi; and the United Nations Development Program in New York and Cairo. Upon leaving public service, he moved to Toronto in 1995, and entered the art world to become one of Canada's foremost art dealers  guiding the formation of some of North America's major art collections, along with a number of corporate and private art collections. Such as the Thomson Collection (Art Gallery of Ontario), as well as to The Sobey Art Collection, Nova Scotia, to UNESCO, Paris, as well as private collections.

Publications
He has articles and books on Canadian art, among them Canadian Art: Selected Masters from Private Collections (2003), Independent Spirit: Early Canadian Women Artists (2008), a celebration of work by women artists who changed the face of Canadian art, and Impressionism in Canada: A Journey of Rediscovery (2014), called “astonishingly comprehensive” by one reviewer.  It was a best seller on Amazon and a second edition was published by Arnoldsche Art Publishers, Stuttgart.

Philanthropy
In 2012, he established the A. K. Prakash Foundation with the following goals: to advance scholarship on historical Canadian Art, and to promote Canadian medical expertise in increasing global access to health.

Art
The Foundation has sponsored numerous exhibitions and publications in major art galleries across Canada and abroad in the United Kingdom, France, Switzerland, Norway and the Netherlands. Some of the major Canadian exhibitions included, among others, Painting Canada: Tom Thomson and the Group of Seven (National Gallery of Canada), Into the Light: The Paintings of William Blair Bruce (1859-1906) (Art Gallery of Hamilton),  From the Forest to the Sea: Emily Carr in British Columbia (Art Gallery of Ontario), Modernism in Montreal: The Beaver Hall Group (Montreal Museum of Fine Arts), James Wilson Morrice: The A.K. Prakash Collection in Trust to the Nation (National Gallery of Canada), and Canada and Impressionism: New Horizons (National Gallery of Canada). In 2021, he funded an exhibition of a collection of bronzes by Marc-Aurèle de Foy Suzor-Coté, Alfred Laliberté, and Louis-Philippe Hébert that he gave to the Musée d’art de Joliette. 

In 2015, the National Gallery of Canada received 50 works by James Wilson Morrice, which Prakash acquired work by work since the early 1980s and regarded as the heart of his collection, valued at more than $20 million. The A.K. Prakash Foundation, founded by Prakash, made the donation in honour of the artist's 150th birthday. 

Prakash made the following announcement: 
"The collection represents a governing force of my life's work. It is my gift to Canada donated in the hope that Morrice will inspire and enrich the lives of my fellow citizens and help remind us that Canadian art stands with the best in the world."

In honour of the gift, in 2015, the National Gallery named a gallery for Prakash and made the Morrice paintings part of a re-launch of the permanent collection in 2017, celebrating the 150th anniversary of the confederation of Canada.

Medical

Prakash also founded The A.K. Prakash Fellowship in International Medicine. Annual Fellowships are awarded to medical graduates from the Global South to train under surgeons in the Faculty of Medicine at the University of Toronto and then return to their home countries to build and strengthen clinical care and education.

University of Toronto president Meric Gertler said of the foundation:
"The Prakash Fellowships provide a wonderful example of the power of philanthropy in the advancement of the University of Toronto as a major force for good in our world"

Dr. James Rutka, University of Toronto's chair of the department of surgery said of the fellows:
"Many of them are establishing training programs and clinical centres and meeting urgent patient needs in their countries."

Past A.K. Prakash Fellowship in International Medicine Fellows

 Dr. Faith Muchemwa, Plastic & Reconstructive Surgeon, Harare, Zimbabwe
 Dr. James A. Balogun, Neurosurgeon, Nigeria
 Dr. Tihitena Negussie Mammo, Pediatric Surgeon, Addis Ababa, Ethiopia
 Dr. Hanna Getachew Woldeselassie, Pediatric Surgeon, Addis Ababa, Ethiopia
 Dr. Samuel Hailu Teweldemedhin, Orthopaedic Surgeon, Addis Ababa, Ethiopia, 2015-2016
 Dr. Andrew Perry, Breast Cancer Surgeon, Trinidad & Tobego
 Dr. Geletaw Tesema Bekele, Orthopaedic Surgeon, Addis Ababa, Ethiopia
 Dr. Grace Muthoni Thiong'o, Pediatric Neurosurgeon, Kenya, 2017-2018
 Dr. Tewodros Tilahun Zerfu, Pediatric Orthopaedic Surgeon, Addis Ababa, Ethiopia
 Dr Lyronne Kelson Christopher Olivier, Breast Cancer Surgery, Trinidad & Tobago
 Dr. Priyank Yadav, Paediatric Urology, India
 Dr. Misgana Temesgen Workneh, Orthopaedic Surgery, Ethiopia
 Dr. Mnewar Yirga Ahmed, Orthopaedic Surgery, Ethiopia
 Dr. Peace Ifeoma Amaraegbulam, Orthopaedic Surgery, Umuahia, Nigeria
 Dr. Ncedile Mankahla, Paediatric Neurosurgery, Cape Town, South Africa
 Dr. Gabriela Alejandra Buerba Romero-Valdés, Breast Cancer Surgery, Mexico
 Dr. Funmi Wuraola, Breast Cancer Surgery, Nigeria

Honours
 Citation for "Loyal Service to the Government and People of Canada" by The Right Honourable Jean Chrétien,  Prime Minister of Canada, 1997
 Dedication of “Ash K Prakash Gallery” by The National Gallery of Canada, 2015
 Distinguished Patron of the National Gallery of Canada, 2016
 Doctor of Fine Art (honoris causa) Awarded by The Nova Scotia College of Art and Design University, 2017
 Member of Order of Canada,  Awarded by The Governor General of Canada, 2019

References

1946 births
Living people
Canadian art collectors
Canadian art dealers
Haas School of Business alumni
University of Michigan alumni
Harvard University alumni
Indian emigrants to Canada
Members of the Order of Canada
People from Ambala